Clank is an unincorporated community in Alexander County, Illinois, United States. Clank is located along a defunct railroad line southwest of Tamms.

References

Unincorporated communities in Alexander County, Illinois
Unincorporated communities in Illinois
Cape Girardeau–Jackson metropolitan area